The 2021 Stock Car Pro Series was the forty-third season of Stock Car Brasil.

Gabriel Casagrande of A.Mattheis Vogel Motorsport won the Drivers' Championship for the first time in his career. The 3-time champion Daniel Serra of Eurofarma RC finished runner up. Eurofarma RC won the Teams' Championship.

Teams and drivers

Team changes 

After the series increased the maximum race entries to 32 cars per race, Toyota Gazoo Racing Brasil upsized from eight cars to ten cars. Ex GP2 Series team MX Piquet Sports entered in the series with two Corolla Stock Cars., Stock Car Light team RKL Competições entered with a single car and a new team called Pole Motorsport joined the championship.
Crown Racing downsized from four to two cars. The team finished their partnership with Shell Oil Company. Pole Motorsport and Shell joined forces to continue Shell V-Power Racing.
KTF Sports upsized from two to fours cars, and Blau Motorsport/TMG Racing also upsized from two from three cars. 
After the death of owner Amadeu Rodrigues, Hot Car Competições was taken over by his daughters. After competing with a single car in 2020, the team returned to operating two cars.
Rodolfo Mattheis' team separated from his father Andreas Mattheis due to conflicts with sponsors. R.Mattheis Motorsport was renamed Lubrax Podium while A.Mattheis Motorsport (Ipiranga Racing) now has Vogel Motorsport as a new customer team.

Driver Changes 
Lubrax Podium announced ex-Formula One driver Felipe Massa and Júlio Campos, who returned to the team after one season.
Atila Abreu and Galid Osman moved from Crown Racing to Pole Motorsport, but still drive under the Shell V-Power Racing name 
With Blau Motorsport upgrading to three cars, ex Euroformula Open Championship driver Christian Hanh debuted in the series with his father's team. 
KTF Racing expanded to four cars, with Lucas Foresti and Pedro Cardoso driving the two new entries. 
Hot Car expanded to two cars, with Felipe Lappenna joining the team.
Nelson Piquet Jr. departed Full Time Sports and moved to his own team MX Piquet Sports alongside Sergio Jimenez, who returned to the championship after two years at the Jaguar I-Pace eTrophy. Piquet was replaced by Tony Kanaan at FTS.
Vogel Motorsport announced Gabriel Casagrande and Gustavo Lima both returning to the team after leaving previously.
Stock Car Light driver Gustavo Frigoto joined RKL Competições team for both to debut in the championship.
Vitor Baptista and Vitor Genz did not return after competing part-time the previous season.

Mid-season changes 
Due to travel restrictions between Argentina and Brazil, Matias Rossi did not compete in three rounds, as follows: #1 (Goiânia), #5 (Cascavel) and #7 (Curitiba). The Argentine driver was replaced by Max Wilson in the first round, and by Dudu Barrichello in the fifth and seventh rounds, respectively.
Ricardo Mauricio tested positive for COVID-19 in the second round and was replaced by Portuguese driver António Félix da Costa. Da Costa was ineligible to score points towards the drivers' championship due to a requirement that drivers competing for the championship must be registered with a South American FIA member organization.
Gustavo Frigotto, diagnosed with COVID-19, did not participate in the sixth and seventh rounds. Due to a budget shortage, Gustavo Frigotto made room for Raphael Teixeira. The announcement of the exchange took place before round 8.
Due to contractual issues in the United States, Tony Kanaan did not compete in the seventh round in Curitiba. The driver was replaced by Pietro Fittipaldi.
Nelson Piquet Jr. and his team ended their participation in the current season just before the eighth round in order to focus in the 2022 season. MX Piquet Sports was replaced by TCR South America Touring Car Championship team Scuderia CJ, that maintains a structure and points in the team championship. Sergio Jimenez also owner of the team was the only driver announced.
Sérgio Jimenez tested positive for COVID-19 and was replaced by Danilo Dirani in the tenth stage held in Mogi-Guaçu.
Due to personal commitments, Tuca Antoniazi was replaced by Valdeno Brito in the eleventh round held in Santa Cruz do Sul.

Schedule and race results

Scoring system
Points are awarded for each race at an event to the driver/s of a car that completed at least 75% of the race distance and was running at the completion of the race. Before the last round, the four worst results are discarded.

Feature races Used for the first race of each event.
Sprint races:The second race of each event, with partially reversed (top ten) grid.

Standings

Drivers' Championship

 As António Félix da Costa was ineligible to score points, his finishing position was ignored when scoring points of other competitors.

 As Dudu Barrichello was ineligible to score points, his finishing position was ignored when scoring points of other competitors.

Teams' Championship

Manufacturers' Championship

Broadcasting

Simulation games 
 Automobilista 2. Reiza Studios. Brazil. An advanced racing simulator which is very popular among the virtual motorsport community. 
 Stock Car Extreme. Reiza Studios. Brazil. A realistic racing game simulating Brazilian Stock Car V8 series, also featuring several extra series and tracks covering a wide variety of racing disciplines.

Notes

References

External links 
  

Stock Car Brasil seasons
Stock Car Brasil
Stock Car Brasil
Stock Car Brasil